Antiplane shear or antiplane strain is a special state of strain in a body.  This state of strain is achieved when the displacements in the body are zero in the plane of interest but nonzero in the direction perpendicular to the plane.  For small strains, the strain tensor under antiplane shear can be written as

 
where the  plane is the plane of interest and the  direction is perpendicular to that plane.

Displacements 
The displacement field that leads to a state of antiplane shear is (in rectangular Cartesian coordinates)

where  are the displacements in the  directions.

Stresses 
For an isotropic, linear elastic material, the stress tensor that results from a state of antiplane shear can be expressed as

where  is the shear modulus of the material.

Equilibrium equation for antiplane shear 
The conservation of linear momentum in the absence of inertial forces takes the form of the equilibrium equation.  For general states of stress there are three equilibrium equations.  However, for antiplane shear, with the assumption that body forces in the 1 and 2 directions are 0, these reduce to one equilibrium equation which is expressed as

Note that this equation is valid only for infinitesimal strains.

Applications 
The antiplane shear assumption is used to determine the stresses and displacements due to a screw dislocation.

References

See also 
Infinitesimal strain theory
Deformation (mechanics)

Elasticity (physics)
Solid mechanics